Leândro Messias dos Santos (born December 29, 1983), also known just as Leândro, is a Brazilian professional footballer who plays as a left-back for Polish Ekstraklasa club Stal Mielec.

Personal life
In October 2018, he obtained Polish citizenship.

Honours
Górnik Łęczna
II liga: 2019–20

References

External links

 

1983 births
Living people
Footballers from Rio de Janeiro (city)
Brazilian footballers
Association football defenders
Naturalized citizens of Poland
Brazilian expatriate footballers
First Professional Football League (Bulgaria) players
Ukrainian Premier League players
Ekstraklasa players
I liga players
II liga players
Paraná Clube players
Criciúma Esporte Clube players
América Futebol Clube (RN) players
Ceará Sporting Club players
PFC Chernomorets Burgas players
FC Hoverla Uzhhorod players
SC Tavriya Simferopol players
FC Volyn Lutsk players
Korona Kielce players
Górnik Łęczna players
Stal Mielec players
Brazilian expatriate sportspeople in Bulgaria
Brazilian expatriate sportspeople in Ukraine
Brazilian expatriate sportspeople in Poland
Expatriate footballers in Bulgaria
Expatriate footballers in Ukraine
Expatriate footballers in Poland